Love to Love is a 2003 Dutch film, directed by Pim van Hoeve.

The film was awarded a Golden Film (100,000 tickets sold) in 2003.

External links 
 

2003 films
2000s Dutch-language films
2003 romantic comedy films
Dutch romantic comedy films
Films directed by Pim van Hoeve